Ivar Eugen Ballangrud (né Eriksen, 7 March 1904 – 1 June 1969) was a Norwegian speed skater, a four-time Olympic champion in speed skating. As the only triple gold medalist at the 1936 Winter Olympics, Ballangrud was the most successful athlete there.

Biography
Ivar Ballangrud was one of the most successful speed skaters in the world for a period of 15 years, from 1924 to 1939. Coming from the small place Lunner on Hadeland, he was a member of the famous "Hadeland Trio", consisting of himself, Michael Staksrud and Hans Engnestangen. He represented the club Trondhjems Skøiteklub.

Ballangrud was four times World Allround Champion, four times European Allround Champion, five times Norwegian Allround Champion, and four times Olympic Champion. He won three Olympic titles at the 1936 Winter Olympics in Garmisch-Partenkirchen: 500 m (quite surprisingly), 5000 m, and 10,000 m. On the 1500 m during those Winter Olympics, he won silver – his teammate Charles Mathiesen being the only one to keep him from winning gold in all four speed skating events. Ballangrud had won his first Olympic gold 8 years earlier on the 5000 m at the 1928 Winter Olympics. In addition, he won a bronze medal (1500 m) in 1928 and a silver medal (10,000 m) at the 1932 Winter Olympics. He would have been the favourite for winning more Olympic gold in 1932 if the races had been held in the normal European way, not the American pack-style way where all competitors are on the ice at the same time.

He made his international debut as a 19-year-old rising star in 1924, although it was too late to compete in the Winter Olympics that year. However, he was paired with Julius Skutnabb – who had just become the Olympic 10,000 m Champion – in his first World Championships in Helsinki in 1924, and beat the champion on his homeground. In 1930, he dethroned Oscar Mathisen from the top of the Adelskalender and he would remain the number one on the Adelskalender for seven years.

In addition to his five official world records, Ballangrud skated 16:46.4 in a 10,000 m pack-style test race before the Olympic Games in 1932. This time was 31 seconds below the then-current world record and it would stand unbeaten as the fastest 10,000 m time for twenty years, until Hjalmar Andersen set his famous world record of 16:32.6.

In December 1932 it was announced that he became professional.

Ballangrud was born as Ivar Eriksen. His mother changed his last name when she remarried following her husband's death. In retirement Ballangrud worked at his sporting good store in Drammen, and later in Trondheim. A statue in his honor was raised in his native Jevnaker.

Records

World records
Over the course of his career, Ballangrud skated five world records:

Source: SpeedSkatingStats.com

Personal records
To put these personal records in perspective, the Notes column lists the official world records on the dates that Ballangrud skated his personal records.

Source: EvertStenlund.se

Note that Ballangrud's personal record on the 1500 m was not a world record because Hans Engnestangen skated 2:13.8 at the same tournament.

Ballangrud has an Adelskalender score of 188.806 points. He was number one on the Adelskalender for a total of 3,675 days, divided over two periods between 1930 and 1942.

Medals
An overview of medals won by Ballangrud at important championships he participated in, listing the years in which he won each:

Source: SpeedSkatingStats.com & Skoyteforbundet.no

References

Further reading

 Eng, Trond. All Time International Championships, Complete Results: 1889–2002. Askim, Norway: WSSSA-Skøytenytt, 2002.
 Eng, Trond; Gjerde, Arild and Teigen, Magne. Norsk Skøytestatistikk Gjennom Tidene, Menn/Kvinner, 1999 (6. utgave). Askim/Skedsmokorset/Veggli, Norway: WSSSA-Skøytenytt, 1999.
 Eng, Trond; Gjerde, Arild; Teigen, Magne and Teigen, Thorleiv. Norsk Skøytestatistikk Gjennom Tidene, Menn/Kvinner, 2004 (7. utgave). Askim/Skedsmokorset/Veggli/Hokksund, Norway: WSSSA-Skøytenytt, 2004.
 Eng, Trond and Teigen, Magne. Komplette Resultater fra offisielle Norske Mesterskap på skøyter, 1894–2005. Askim/Veggli, Norway: WSSSA-Skøytenytt, 2005.
 Teigen, Magne. Komplette Resultater Norske Mesterskap På Skøyter, 1887–1989: Menn/Kvinner, Senior/Junior. Veggli, Norway: WSSSA-Skøytenytt, 1989.
 Teigen, Magne. Komplette Resultater Internasjonale Mesterskap 1889–1989: Menn/Kvinner, Senior/Junior, allround/sprint. Veggli, Norway: WSSSA-Skøytenytt, 1989.
 Ivar Ballangrud. Deutsche Eisschnelllauf Gemeinschaft e.V. (German Skating Association).
 Historical World Records. International Skating Union.

1904 births
1969 deaths
People from Lunner
Norwegian male speed skaters
Olympic speed skaters of Norway
Speed skaters at the 1928 Winter Olympics
Speed skaters at the 1932 Winter Olympics
Speed skaters at the 1936 Winter Olympics
Olympic gold medalists for Norway
Olympic silver medalists for Norway
Olympic bronze medalists for Norway
World record setters in speed skating
Olympic medalists in speed skating
Medalists at the 1928 Winter Olympics
Medalists at the 1932 Winter Olympics
Medalists at the 1936 Winter Olympics
World Allround Speed Skating Championships medalists
Sportspeople from Innlandet